Matthew Zenovich (born 16 February 1994) is a New Zealand cyclist, who currently rides for UCI Continental team .

Major results

2013
 7th Time trial, National Road Championships
2016
 4th The REV Classic
2017
 1st Stage 2 Tour de Ijen
 9th Overall Tour of Taihu Lake
2018
 1st  Overall Tour de Siak
1st Stage 1 
2019
 8th Overall Tour de Iskandar Johor
1st Mountains classification
 10th Overall New Zealand Cycle Classic
 10th Overall Tour of Taihu Lake

References

External links

1994 births
Living people
New Zealand male cyclists